Brahampur is a village in Tehsil Phagwara, Kapurthala district, in Punjab, India. The village is administrated by a Sarpanch who is an elected representative of village as per the constitution of India and Panchayati raj (India). Brahampur Village was founded  and owned by Dewan Banna Mal who hailed from Gautam (Shori Gotra) family of Nawanshahr,  Bana Mal was son of a Vaid Jhanda Mal of Nawanshahr,  Dewan Banna Mal was Manager of Maharaja Randhir Singh Bahadur of Kapurthala 's Estate in Oudh in 1862 A.D. and Chief minister of Kapurthala Princely State , Banna Mal built Shivala Mandir known as Dewan  Banna Mal Shivala in Nawanshahr. Dewan Banna Mal owned one more Village Named after Him' Banna Mal Wala'  near  Dhilwan , Kapurthala.

Transport 
Phagwara Junction Railway Station,  Mauli Halt Railway Station are the very nearby railway stations to Brahampur however, Jalandhar City Rail Way station is 23 km away from the village.  The village is 118 km away from Sri Guru Ram Dass Jee International Airport in Amritsar and the another nearest airport is Sahnewal Airport  in Ludhiana which is located 40 km away from the village.

Nearby villages 
 Manak
 Chair
 Dhak Chair
 Dhak Malikpur
 Dhak Manak 
 Malikpur 
 Nasirabad
 Prempur
 Sahni
 Wahid

References

External links
  Villages in Kapurthala
 Kapurthala Villages List

Villages in Kapurthala district